Emergency & I is the third studio album by American indie rock band The Dismemberment Plan, released in 1999 by DeSoto Records. It was produced by J. Robbins and Chad Clark. At its release, the album was met with critical acclaim.

Barsuk Records reissued Emergency & I in vinyl format on January 11, 2011.

Recording
In 1998, The Dismemberment Plan signed a record deal with Interscope Records. Emergency & I was recorded during the band's time with Interscope and was meant to be the first of the two albums they would record with the label. Using the money from Interscope, the album was recorded at Water Music Studios in Hoboken, New Jersey.

Some songs went through different stages during recording. "Spider in the Snow" was originally going to have real strings. However, Travis Morrison thought that using strings was "too fancy" and decided to use Casio keyboards instead. "What Do You Want Me to Say?" was originally going to have turntable scratching, but the plan was scrapped after producer Chad Clark thought using samples was kitsch. Chad Clark also originally did not want "You Are Invited" to be on Emergency & I, finding the song too sentimental.

Lyrical themes
PopMatters Zachary Houle noted that the album had themes of growing pains experienced by people in their 20s. Jeremy D. Larson of Consequence noted the influence of Stephen Malkmus on the album's lyrics. Paul Thompson of Pitchfork related the album title to the encroaching chaos of modern life with the self.

With regards to individual songs, the track "Back and Forth" is based on Bob Dylan's "It's Alright, Ma (I'm Only Bleeding)". "You Are Invited", a song about an anonymous invitation that comes through the mail, deals with belonging and selflessness. "The City" deals with Morrison's loneliness living in a city, his longing for a wanderlust lover, and his inability to leave the city without abandoning everything that makes him who he is. Zachary Houle argued that songs such as "Memory Machine" and "What Do You Want Me to Say?" deal with themes of disconnectedness in the information age, including predicting the social media phenomenon that would be prominent in the following decade. The lyrics to "The Jitters" were originally written inside a copy of Charles Shaar Murray's musical biography on Jimi Hendrix, Crosstown Traffic: Jimi Hendrix & The Post-War Rock n' Roll Revolution, that Morrison had borrowed from Eric Axelson.

Release
When Geffen Records and A&M Records merged into Interscope in 1999, Universal Music Group announced that they would cut numerous artists from Interscope. The Dismemberment Plan were one of the artists affected by the cut. In turn, the band decided to release Emergency & I on their former label DeSoto Records.

2011 reissue
The band originally wanted Emergency & I to be released on vinyl back in 1999, but decided against that after seeing that vinyl was not a commercially viable option. After seeing a resurgence in vinyl records, the band decided to release the album on vinyl in 2011. Morrison cited sound quality and packaging as reasons he wanted it to be a vinyl release.

On January 11, 2011, Barsuk Records issued the vinyl edition of Emergency & I, which includes an oral history of the band conducted by The A.V. Clubs Josh Modell. The vinyl reissue came with 4 bonus tracks. "Since You Died" was the B-side to the vinyl 7-inch release of "What Do You Want Me to Say?", an earlier recording of the song released in November 1997, before Emergency & I was recorded. "Just Like You" was originally released on the compilation EP Ft. Reno Benefit Compilation in September 1997. "The First Anniversary of Your Last Phone Call" was originally released on The Ice of Boston EP on October 16, 1998. "The Dismemberment Plan Gets Rich" was originally from Juno & The Dismemberment Plan, a split EP between Juno and The Dismemberment Plan released on March 27, 2001.

Reception and legacy

Critical response
Emergency & I received overwhelming critical acclaim. The album has been described by Rolling Stone as "a game-changer for indie rock fans", and Pitchfork describes it as "one of indie's key LPs". Glide Magazine called the album "[The Dismemberment Plan's] landmark masterstroke, still cited by many bands and critics as a turning point in the evolution of indie rock."

Brent DiCrescenzo of Pitchfork originally gave the album a 9.6 out of 10, with a short review that read simply, "If you consider yourself a fan of groundbreaking pop, go out and buy this album right now. Now. Get up. Go." Ned Raggett of AllMusic called the album a "firecracker" which shows the band's "at once passionate and sly approach to music—take in everything, put it back out, and give it its own particular sheen and spin—is in no danger of letting up." Robert Christgau of The Village Voice wrote "The only way [The Dismemberment Plan are] punk anymore is that there aren't very many of them and that none of them seems to be playing a keyboard even though most of them can. What they are instead is a much rarer thing [...] thoughtful, quirky, mercurial young adults skilled at transforming doubt into music."

Accolades and retrospective reviews
Emergency & I was ranked the best album of 1999 by Pitchfork. On the same website, the album was ranked #16 their "redux" version of the Top 100 Albums of the 1990s list, with William Morris writing "The album's lyric book reads better than half the modern volumes on my bookshelf. Modern R&B should have as much rhythm. Modern rock should have as much balls." In addition, the website ranked the track "The City" #64 on their list of the Top 200 Tracks of the 1990s. In December 2007 the album was ranked number 95 on Blenders 100 Greatest Indie-Rock Albums Ever list.

The album's 2011 vinyl reissue brought about numerous positive reviews as well. Zachary Houle of PopMatters wrote that "Just in terms of a sheer personal enjoyment factor, I would almost argue the case for a new rating: the Spinal Tap-esque 11. Emergency & I is just a relentless record, full of youthful abandon and insightful penetrations into the technology-addled brain. I just can't get enough of it." In another review of the reissue, Consequences Jeremy D. Larson wrote: "The Plan colors this record with 12 songs that serve as hitching posts for whatever ails you. Life medicine never sounded better ... Emergency & I continues to arch its influence even after a 12-year gap." Pitchfork gave the reissue a perfect 10/10 with a "best new reissue" designation," while Sputnikmusic's Alex Robertson rated the album "classic" with a perfect 5.0. The album was ranked at number 26 on Spins "The 300 Best Albums of the Past 30 Years (1985–2014)" list.

Track listing

"A Life of Possibilities", "What Do You Want Me to Say?", "The Jitters" and "The City" are all also featured in remixed form on A People's History of The Dismemberment Plan.

Personnel
 Eric Axelson – bass guitar, keyboards
 Jason Caddell – guitar, keyboards
 Joe Easley – drums
 Travis Morrison – vocals, guitar, keyboards

References

External links
Emergency & I on the Dismemberment Plan's website

1999 albums
The Dismemberment Plan albums
DeSoto Records albums
Albums produced by J. Robbins